Chikila fulleri, also known as the Kuttal caecilian, Fuller's caecilian, and Fuller's chikila, is a species of caecilian from South Asia. In 2012 it was reassigned to a newly erected family, Chikilidae.

Etymology
The specific name fulleri honours Joseph Bampfylde Fuller, a British colonial administrator.

Description
Males measure  and females  in total length. The total length is 28–37 times the midbody width. There are 89–92 primary annuli. Dorsal colouration is shiny dark lilac, laterally and ventrally paler lilac with a strong pinkish tinge. The head is paler than the body. The chin, throat and the first few primary annuli have  substantial pale blotches. The eyes are faintly visible, if at all.

Distribution
Chikila fulleri is found in Northeast India (Arunachal Pradesh, Assam, Meghalaya, and Tripura) and in northeastern Bangladesh (Sylhet Division). It probably occurs also in adjacent Myanmar. The type locality is Kuttal, six miles southwest of Silchar in Cachar, Assam, at an altitude of about 100 m above sea level.

Habitat
Chikila fulleri are fossorial, living in the soil, and have been found in both natural and human-altered habitats. They can be locally common. They are oviparous and have direct development (i.e., there is no free-living larval stage).

References

Chikilidae
Amphibians of Bangladesh
Amphibians of India
Amphibians described in 1904
Taxa named by Alfred William Alcock